Turabul Haq Dargah, is a tomb of the Sufi saint Turabul Haq, also known as Turatpeer Baba who spent most of his last days in Parbhani.

About 
Dargah is best known for its annual fair, which has history of 108 years, thousands of followers of all religions and faiths gather together between 2 February to 15 February each year.
In Parbhani this dargah is the symbol of unity between all religions. People from across the state visits the dargah.

Thousands of followers of dargah claim that their wish got fulfilled after visiting this dargah. Because of huge popularity of dargah in Maharashtra state, it is often called as "Ajmer Sharif of Maharashtra". Thousands of diseased persons visit this dargah in the hope of healthy life. It is estimated that nearly 5 lakh (half million) people visited dargah during 2015 festival season between 2 February to 15 February.

Transport 
Parbhani is well connected by roads and trains to cities like Mumbai, Bangalore, Hyderabad, Amritsar, Bhopal, New Delhi, Nagpur, Pune. 
Nearest airport is to Parbhani is Aurangabad Airport and Nanded Airport.

Gallery

See also
Ajmer Sharif Dargah
Ashrafpur Kichhauchha 
Tourism in Marathwada

External links
Symbol of social and religious unity -In Marathi

References

Dargahs in India
Tourist attractions in Parbhani district
Parbhani
Religious buildings and structures in Maharashtra